Strojetice is a municipality and village in Benešov District in the Central Bohemian Region of the Czech Republic. It has about 100 inhabitants.

History
The first written mention of Strojetice is from 1306.

References

Villages in Benešov District